Brian Griffiths may refer to:

 Brian Griffiths (artist) (born 1968), artist based in London
 Brian Griffiths (footballer) (born 1933), Welsh former footballer
 Brian Griffiths, Baron Griffiths of Fforestfach (born 1941), British Conservative politician
 Bill Griffiths (poet) (Brian William Bransom Griffiths, 1948–2007)
 Jim Griffiths (cricketer) (Brian James Griffiths, born 1949), Northamptonshire bowler

See also
 Bryan Griffiths (born 1965), English former footballer
 Bryan Griffiths (footballer, born 1939)
 Brian Griffith (disambiguation)